In mathematics, particularly in universal algebra and category theory, transport of structure refers to the process whereby a mathematical object acquires a new structure and its canonical definitions, as a result of being isomorphic to (or otherwise identified with) another object with a pre-existing structure. Definitions by transport of structure are regarded as canonical.

Since mathematical structures are often defined in reference to an underlying space, many examples of transport of structure involve spaces and mappings between them.

Although the equation makes sense even when  is not an isomorphism, it only defines an inner product on  when  is, since otherwise it will cause  to be degenerate.

Furthermore, it is required that the charts cover  (the fact that the transported charts cover  follows immediately from the fact that  is a bijection).

 (a self-map of )

is smooth.

,
and therefore
, and
.

That is,  is a smooth manifold via transport of structure. This is a special case of transport of structures in general.

The second example also illustrates why "transport of structure" is not always desirable. That is, one can consider  as a subspace of 3-space, in which context it is not smooth at the cone point.  

Thus, transport of structure is most productive when there exists a canonical isomorphism between the two objects.

See also 

 List of mathematical jargon
 Equivalent definitions of mathematical structures#Transport of structures; isomorphism

References 

Mathematical terminology
Mathematical structures